Stanisława Teresa Szydłowska (born 21 April 1944 in Zaręby Kościelne) is a Polish sprint canoeist who competed in the late 1960s and early 1970s. Competing in two Summer Olympics, she was eliminated in the semifinals in the K-1 500 m event both in 1968 and in 1972.

References
 Sports-reference.com profile

1944 births
Canoeists at the 1968 Summer Olympics
Canoeists at the 1972 Summer Olympics
Living people
Olympic canoeists of Poland
Polish female canoeists
People from Ostrów Mazowiecka County
Sportspeople from Masovian Voivodeship
20th-century Polish women